Asakaze is a general cargo vessel, registered in Panama City. The container ship delivers cargo around the Asia-Pacific area, including China, South Korea and Vietnam.

Description

References

Ships of Panama
2014 ships